William was launched at Kingston upon Hull in 1811. She made 19 complete voyages to Davis Strait and Greenland in the British northern whale fishery, but was lost to ice on her 20th. Her loss gave rise to an interesting case in claims for salvage.

Career
William first appeared in Lloyd's Register (LR) in the volume for 1811.

The whaling data below is from Coltish, augmented with press reports.

Fate
On 2 July 1830 William became trapped in ice at Davis Strait, leading her crew to abandon her and join other whaling vessels in the area. They then set fire to the upper part of William, lightening her and causing her to rise. When she rose to the point that the beams above the casks of blubber she had collected were exposed, they set fire to them too. When the casks appeared, the crews put out the fire. When Williams master would not sign over her blubber and whale fins to the crews, Zephyr sailed away. Traveller took on 70 butts of blubber and one ton of whale fins. Captain George Simpson took them back with him and sold them, keeping the proceeds for himself and his men. Williams owners sued for the proceeds, but Simpson argued that it was a long-standing custom of the whaling trade that salvaged cargo belonged to the men who had salvaged it. The jury found for the plaintiffs, who had estimated the value of the lost whale products at £500, and awarded them £392. Although all but one witness, all of whom were masters of whaling ships, testified for the defendant, the jury found for the plaintiff.

Captain William North died a few days after the loss of William, and so was not in a position to testify in the case.

Citations

References

 
 

1811 ships
Ships built in Kingston upon Hull
Age of Sail merchant ships of England
Whaling ships
Maritime incidents in July 1830